Ram's Horn is a family restaurant restaurant chain in the Detroit, Michigan metropolitan area. It was founded by three brothers, Gus, Gene, and Steve Kasapis, with the first location opening in 1967. There are now 25 locations in Metro Detroit. Most stores are independently owned. In 2013, a location in Livonia, Michigan burned down.

References

External links
 Company website

Restaurants in Michigan
Regional restaurant chains in the United States
Restaurants established in 1967
1967 establishments in Michigan